Alison Testroete (born 22 July 1983) is a road cyclist from Canada. She represented her nation at the 2009 UCI Road World Championships.

See also
 2011 Skil Koga season

References

External links
 profile at Procyclingstats.com
 Cycling Tours in Italy Alison runs

1983 births
Canadian female cyclists
Living people
Place of birth missing (living people)